Jörg Reinhardt (born 1956, Homburg, Saarland, Germany) has been Chairman of the Board of Directors of the Swiss pharmaceutical group Novartis AG since 2013. Since 2017, he has also been a member of the Board of Directors of the Swiss reinsurance group Swiss Re.

Life and career 
Reinhardt studied pharmacy at the University of Saarland and graduated in 1982 with a doctorate. He started his career in 1982 with Sandoz, who merged with Ciba-Geigy in 1996 to form Novartis.

At Sandoz, he worked in research and development and became head of development in 1994. Following the merger into Novartis, Reinhardt was responsible for preclinical development throughout the group and later for the entire drug development. In 2008, he became Chief Operating Officer of Novartis.

From 2000 to 2010 Reinhardt was President of the Board of Trustees of the Genomics Institute of the Novartis Research Foundation in the United States. From 2010 to 2012, he was Chairman of the Board of Management of Bayer HealthCare AG and Chairman of the Bayer HealthCare Executive Committee.

Other activities

Corporate boards
 Swiss Re, Non-Executive Independent Member of the Board of Directors (since 2017)
 Lonza Group, Member of the Board of Directors (2012-2013)
 MorphoSys, Member of the Supervisory Board (2001-2004)
 Temasek Holdings, Member of the European Advisory Panel

Non-profit organizations
 Robert Koch Foundation, Member of the Board of Trustees

Personal life
Reinhardt is married and father of two children. He lives, since the completion of his studies, in Germany near Freiburg im Breisgau

References 

Business executives
German pharmacists
Saarland University alumni
1956 births
Living people